Whittier Creek is a  long 2nd order tributary to Bull Creek in Surry County, North Carolina.

Variant names
According to the Geographic Names Information System, it has also been known historically as:
Whittaker Creek

Course 
Whittier Creek rises about 2 miles south of Ash Hill, North Carolina, in Surry County and then flows south and east to join Bull Creek at Blackwater.

Watershed 
Whittier Creek drains  of area, receives about 47.9 in/year of precipitation, has a wetness index of 372.49, and is about 37% forested.

See also 
 List of Rivers of North Carolina

References 

Rivers of Surry County, North Carolina
Rivers of North Carolina